Piz d'Arbeola (2,600 m) is a mountain of the Lepontine Alps, south of San Bernardino in the canton of Graubünden. It lies between the Val Calanca and the Val Mesolcina, north of Piz Pian Grand.

References

External links
 Piz d'Arbeola on Hikr

Mountains of Graubünden
Mountains of the Alps
Lepontine Alps
Mountains of Switzerland
Two-thousanders of Switzerland